Rachel Fattal (born December 10, 1993) is an American water polo player. Fattal attended Los Alamitos High School and graduated in 2012. She then attended UCLA, where she majored in history and played water polo; she graduated in 2017.

She was part of the American team winning the gold medal at the 2015 World Aquatics Championships, where she played in the driver position. She was also part of the gold medal-winning American team at the 2016 Summer Olympics. She was the top sprinter at the 2016 Olympics, with 17 sprints won.

See also
 United States women's Olympic water polo team records and statistics
 List of Olympic champions in women's water polo
 List of Olympic medalists in water polo (women)
 List of world champions in women's water polo
 List of World Aquatics Championships medalists in water polo

References

External links
 

1993 births
Living people
American female water polo players
Water polo drivers
People from Los Alamitos, California
Water polo players at the 2016 Summer Olympics
Medalists at the 2016 Summer Olympics
Olympic gold medalists for the United States in water polo
World Aquatics Championships medalists in water polo
Water polo players at the 2015 Pan American Games
Pan American Games medalists in water polo
Pan American Games gold medalists for the United States
Medalists at the 2015 Pan American Games
Water polo players at the 2020 Summer Olympics
UCLA Bruins women's water polo players
Medalists at the 2020 Summer Olympics